Lockhart Ridge is a conspicuous ridge in Antarctica. The ridge was named by the Texas Tech Shackleton Glacier Expedition (1964–65) for CWO James J. Lockhart, a pilot with the U.S. Army Aviation Detachment which supported the expedition.

References

Named for James Lockhart, an African American helicopter pilot who was featured in a Life Magazine photo spread as he rescued a fallen climber from the ridge by suspending his aircraft on one skid balanced by the rotor as the man was fastened into the stretcher and flown out SIDEWAYS so that the rotor would not strike the ice wall.

Ridges of the Ross Dependency
Dufek Coast